Colin P. Smith (born ) CBE FRS FREng FRAeS FIMechE was director of engineering and technology at Rolls-Royce plc.

Career
Smith was employed in numerous roles during his 40 years at Rolls-Royce since 1974. He was chief design engineer for the Rolls-Royce Trent 500, which powers the Airbus A340. He was also the chief engineer for the Rolls-Royce Trent 700 engine used on the Airbus A330 and chief engineer for the Rolls-Royce Turbomeca RTM322 helicopter engine.  He was appointed to the board of directors at Rolls-Royce in July 2005.

Education
Smith was educated at the University of Southampton where he was awarded a Bachelor of Science degree in mechanical engineering.

Awards and honours
Smith was elected a Fellow of the Royal Society (FRS) in 2014. His nomination reads: 

In 2017, Smith was elected a member of the National Academy of Engineering for leadership in design, technologies, and manufacturing processes that enhance airworthiness, safety, and environmental sustainability of large aeroengines.

Smith was awarded Commander of the Most Excellent Order of the British Empire (CBE),  in the 2012 Birthday Honours. He is also a Honorary Fellow of the Royal Aeronautical Society (HonFRAeS), the Institution of Mechanical Engineers (FIMechE) and a member of the Council for Science and Technology. Smith was awarded an honorary Doctor of Science degree from the University of Oxford.

References

Living people
Fellows of the Royal Society
Fellows of the Royal Aeronautical Society
Fellows of the Institution of Mechanical Engineers
Fellows of the Royal Academy of Engineering
Alumni of the University of Southampton
Rolls-Royce people
Commanders of the Order of the British Empire
Year of birth missing (living people)